Malekabad (also Romanized as Malekābād) is a village in Bampur-e Sharqi Rural District, in the Central District of Bampur County, Sistan and Baluchestan Province, Iran. At the 2006 census, its population was 896, in 189 families.

References 

Populated places in Bampur County